The Urubamba River or Vilcamayo River (possibly from Quechua Willkamayu, for "sacred river") is a river in Peru. Upstream it is called Vilcanota River (possibly from Aymara Willkanuta, for "house of the sun"). Within the La Convención Province the naming changes to Urubamba. A partially navigable headwater of the Amazon River, it rises in the Andes to the southeast of Cuzco. It originates on the slopes of Khunurana in the Puno Region, Melgar Province, near the La Raya pass. It flows north-north-west for 724 kilometers before coalescing with the Tambo River to form the Ucayali River.

The Urubamba is divided into Upper Urubamba and Lower Urubamba, the dividing feature being the Pongo de Mainique, an infamous whitewater canyon.

Upper Urubamba
The Upper Urubamba (Alto Urubamba) valley features a high population  and extensive irrigation works. A number of ruins of the Inca Empire lie in the Sacred Valley, including  the Incan city of Machu Picchu, Patallaqta, Pikillaqta and Raqch'i. The Salcca-Pucara hydroelectric project is associated with the river as well.

Lower Urubamba
The Lower Urubamba (Bajo Urubamba) is relatively undeveloped and features a significant indigenous population consisting of the Campa tribes, principally the Machiguenga (Matsigenka) and Asháninka. The economy is based on forestry and the nearby Camisea Gas Project. The main settlement in the region is the town of Sepahua. (Sepahua River coordinates are

1934 first mapping
The lower Urubamba River was mapped for the first time in 1934 by Edward Kellog Strong III.  He and two friends from Palo Alto, California, Art Post and Gain Allan John, navigated the river with its ferocious rapids by canoe and balsa rafts provided by the indigenous people. The mapping was done at the request of the Peruvian military when they heard of the expedition planned by the three 18-year-olds.

John Walter Gregory, a British geologist, drowned in the river on June 2, 1932 while on a geological expedition to the Andes.

It was turned over to the military when the boys arrived in Iquitos. It was the only map of the river until it was mapped by satellite many years later. The names and places on the latest map came from the original map drawn by Edward Strong.

Tributaries
Yukay
Pampacchuana
Aobamba
Ste. Teresa or Salcantay
Sacsara
Luq'umayu
Vilcabamba
Chawpimayu
Pampaconas
San Miguel
Comportayoc
Concevidayoc
Cosireni

See also

 Sacred Valley

References 

Rivers of Peru
Tributaries of the Ucayali River
Rivers of Cusco Region
Rivers of Puno Region
Rivers of Ucayali Region